The 1939 Sewanee Tigers football team was an American football team that represented Sewanee: The University of the South as a member of the Southeastern Conference during the 1939 college football season. In their ninth season under head coach Harry E. Clark, Sewanee compiled a 3–5 record.

Schedule

References

Sewanee
Sewanee Tigers football seasons
Sewanee Tigers football